Eagle Rock High School (ERHS) is a public school located in the Eagle Rock neighborhood of northeast Los Angeles, California.

History
The school opened its doors on September 12, 1927.

It was in the Los Angeles City High School District until 1961, when it merged into LAUSD.

Eagle Rock was relieved of overcrowding when Central Region High School 13, also known as Taylor Yard and then as Sonia M. Sotomayor Learning Academies opened in 2011.

Student Body
Eagle Rock High School serves the Northeast Los Angeles neighborhoods of Eagle Rock and Mt. Washington, as well as parts of Highland Park and Glassell Park.

The student body is estimated to be 60% Hispanic, 28% Asian, 9% Non-Hispanic White, 2% Black, 0.4% Pacific Islander/Native American, and 0.04% Mixed Race. U.S. News & World Report estimates that 65% of students are economically disadvantaged, meaning they are eligible for the free- or reduced-lunch program. Out of the student body, 51% are eligible for the free lunch program—capped at a household income of $29,995 for a family of four—while 14% of students are eligible for the reduced lunch program—capped at a household income of $42,643 for a family of four.

Notable alumni 

Guy Allison (born 1959), musician
Roger Bobo, musician
Luis Bonilla, musician
Conrad Buff IV, Oscar winning film co-editor, "Titanic" (1997)/ co-editor, "Terminator 2: Judgement Day" (1991)
Alex Cabagnot, PBA basketball player
Mark Caguioa, PBA basketball player
Dan Cantore, Olympic weightlifter
Mike Carter (born 1955), American-Israeli basketball player
Pimbongkod Chankaew, beauty queen
Scott Colley (born 1963), musician
James Corrigan, cross country runner
Bob Hall, car designer and journalist
Hudson Houck (born 1943), NFL football coach
Roger Ingram (born 1957), musician and author
Jere H. Lipps (born 1939), scientist
Buddy Noonan, TV producer
Darian Sahanaja, musician
Robert Shaw, conductor
Marley Shelton, actor
Minh Thai, former world record holder/fastest time to solve a Rubik's cube
Robert Totten, television/film director
Tui St. George Tucker, composer
Carlos Vega, musician
Lindsay Wagner, actor

References

Eagle Rock, Los Angeles
High schools in Los Angeles
Los Angeles Unified School District schools
Public high schools in California
Public middle schools in California
1927 establishments in California